The South Fork Flathead River is a major river in Northwestern Montana in the northwest United States. It is one of the three main forks of the Flathead River, a tributary of the Clark Fork River (the Pend Oreille River).

The river begins in the Bob Marshall Wilderness south of Glacier National Park, as does the Middle Fork Flathead River, at the confluence of two streams, Danaher Creek and Youngs Creek, between the Flathead Range and the Swan Range. The river enters a narrow gorge, running north, then begins to enter the backwater of Hungry Horse Reservoir after receiving Meadow Creek from the left. Hungry Horse Reservoir occupies much of the lower half of the river, covering . The reservoir trends north then northwest, and the river then passes through the arched Hungry Horse Dam, just a few miles above the mouth. After it leaves the dam, the river enters a narrow gorge and, exiting the canyon for the final time, runs northwest past the town of Hungry Horse, then joins the Flathead River, just a few miles below its headwaters at the North Fork and Middle Forks' convergence.

Notes

Rivers of Montana
Tributaries of the Columbia River
Rivers of Flathead County, Montana
Wild and Scenic Rivers of the United States